Walik is a hamlet in the North-Brabant municipality of Bergeijk and is located to the west of the village of Riethoven.

Walik is an agricultural community with some farms located near a brink (village square). 

The hamlet was first mentioned between 1838 and 1857 as Waalwijk, and means "settlement around a pool'. There are three farms around the brink which are characteristic examples of Campian long gable farms and have been declared a monument.

References 

Populated places in North Brabant
Bergeijk